Neukirch is a town in the district of Bodensee in Baden-Württemberg in Germany.

References 

Bodenseekreis